Steve Lemmens (September 8, 1972 – October 11, 2016) was a Belgian former professional snooker player who played on the main tour between 1991 and 1995.

Career
Lemmens first burst onto the snooker scene in his home country when at the age of 16 he reached the finals of the Belgian Amateur Championship, a record that would not be beaten until 2010 by Luca Brecel. Three years later in 1990 he won the Belgian Championship after defeating five-time champion Mario Lannoye 7–2 in the final, as a result Lemmens went on to represent Belgium in the 1990 World Amateur Championship where he reached the final eventually losing 11–8 to Irishman Stephen O'Connor.

Following on from this success Lemmens turned professional in 1991, in a time where the tour was a largely open affair with over 700 players allowed to compete professionally. He had several years on the tour but ultimately only managed to achieve limited success with an appearance in the last 32 of the 1993 Welsh Open being his most successful result and never having climbed higher than 167th in the world rankings. By 1995, Lemmens had fallen further in the world rankings, and dropped off of the main tour at the end of the 1994–95 snooker season.

In 1996 he once again competed in the world amateur championship reaching the semi-finals before losing to eventual winner and future world champion Stuart Bingham.

Death
On 10 October 2016, at the age of 44, Lemmens committed suicide when he stood in front of a train at Wezemaal.

Career finals

Amateur finals: 6 (1 title)

References

Belgian snooker players
1972 births
2016 suicides
Sportspeople from Leuven
Suicides by train
Suicides in Belgium